{{Automatic taxobox
| name = Eumetazoans
| fossil_range = Ediacaran - Present, 
| image = 
| image_caption = Diversity of eumetazoans
| display_parents = 7
| taxon = Eumetazoa
| authority = Buetschli, 1910
| subdivision_ranks = Phyla
| subdivision = * Ctenophora 
 † Trilobozoa
Chancelloriida
 †Proarticulata
 ParaHoxozoa (unranked)
 Placozoa
 Cnidaria
 Bilateria (unranked)
 Xenacoelomorpha?
 Nephrozoa (unranked)
 Superphylum Deuterostomia Chordata
 "Ambulacraria"
 Hemichordata
 Echinodermata
Xenacoelomorpha?
 Protostomia (unranked) Superphylum Ecdysozoa Kinorhyncha
 Loricifera
 Priapulida
 Nematoda
 Nematomorpha
 Onychophora
 Tardigrada
 Arthropoda
 Spiralia (unranked)
 Orthonectida
 Rhombozoa
 Chaetognatha
 Superphylum Platyzoa Platyhelminthes
 Gastrotricha
 Rotifera
 Acanthocephala
 Gnathostomulida
 Micrognathozoa
 Cycliophora
 Superphylum Lophotrochozoa Hyolitha†
 Nemertea
 Phoronida
 Bryozoa
 Entoprocta
 Brachiopoda
 Mollusca
 Annelida
| synonyms = *Enterozoa Lankester, 1877, em. BeklemishevBeklemishev, V. L. The basis of the comparative anatomy of the invertebrates [Основы сравнительной анатомии беспозвоночных]. 1st ed., 1944; 2nd ed., 1950; 3rd ed. (2 vols.), 1964. English translation, 1969, . Akademia Nauk, Moscow, Leningrad.
 Epitheliozoa Ax, 1996
Diploblast Lankester, 1873
Histozoa Ulrich, 1950
}}Eumetazoa, also known as diploblasts, Epitheliozoa, or Histozoa', are a proposed basal animal clade as a sister group of the Porifera (sponges). The basal eumetazoan clades are the Ctenophora and the ParaHoxozoa. Placozoa is now also seen as a eumetazoan in the ParaHoxozoa.

Several other extinct or obscure life forms, such as Iotuba and Thectardis, appear to have emerged in the group. Characteristics of eumetazoans include true tissues organized into germ layers, the presence of neurons and muscles, and an embryo that goes through a gastrula stage.

Some phylogenists once speculated the sponges and eumetazoans evolved separately from different single-celled organisms, which would have meant that the animal kingdom does not form a clade (a complete grouping of all organisms descended from a common ancestor). However, genetic studies and some morphological characteristics, like the common presence of choanocytes, now unanimously support a common origin.

Traditionally, eumetazoans are a major group of animals in the Five Kingdoms classification of Lynn Margulis and K. V. Schwartz, comprising the Radiata and Bilateria – all animals except the sponges.  When treated as a formal taxon Eumetazoa is typically ranked as a subkingdom. The name Metazoa has also been used to refer to this group, but more often refers to the Animalia as a whole. Many classification schemes do not include a subkingdom Eumetazoa.

Taxonomy
A widely accepted hypothesis, based on molecular data (mostly 18S rRNA sequences), divides Bilateria into four superphyla: Deuterostomia, Ecdysozoa, Lophotrochozoa, and Platyzoa (sometimes included in Lophotrochozoa). The last three groups are also collectively known as Protostomia.

However, some skeptics emphasize inconsistencies in the new data. The zoologist Claus Nielsen argues in his 2001 book Animal Evolution: Interrelationships of the Living Phyla for the traditional divisions of Protostomia and Deuterostomia.

Evolutionary origins
It has been suggested that one type of molecular clock and one approach to interpretation of the fossil record both place the evolutionary origins of eumetazoa in the Ediacaran. However, the earliest eumetazoans may not have left a clear impact on the fossil record and other interpretations of molecular clocks suggest the possibility of an earlier origin. The discoverers of Vernanimalcula describe it as the fossil of a bilateral triploblastic animal that appeared at the end of the Marinoan glaciation prior to the Ediacaran Period, implying an even earlier origin for eumetazoans.

References

External links

Bilateria. Tree of Life web project, US National Science Foundation. 2002. 6 January 2006.
Invertebrates and the Origin of Animal Diversity
Evers, Christine A., Lisa Starr. Biology:Concepts and Applications.'' 6th ed. United States:Thomson, 2006. .
TRICHOPLAX ADHAERENS (PLACOZOA TYPE) St. Petersburg. 2005
Metazoa: the Animals
Nielsen, C. 2001. Animal Evolution: Interrelationships of the Living Phyla, 2nd edition, 563 pp. Oxford Univ. Press, Oxford.  
 
 

Animal taxa
Subkingdoms
Ediacaran first appearances